Sveti Đurđ is a village and municipality in Croatia in Varaždin County.

According to the 2011 census, there are 3,804 inhabitants, in the following settlements:
 Hrženica, population 830
 Karlovec Ludbreški, population 591
 Komarnica Ludbreška, population 180
 Luka Ludbreška, population 255
 Obrankovec, population 113
 Priles, population 230
 Sesvete Ludbreške, population 492
 Struga, population 461
 Sveti Đurđ, population 652

The absolute majority of inhabitants are Croats. The municipality was established in 1993.

References

Municipalities of Croatia
Populated places in Varaždin County